Kirsten Harris-Talley (born 1979) is an American politician serving as a member of the Washington House of Representatives from the 37th legislative district. She assumed office on January 11, 2021.

Early life and education 
Harris-Talley was born in Chilhowee, Missouri and moved to Warrensburg, Missouri after her parents divorced. She earned an associate degree in fine and studio arts from the School of the Art Institute of Chicago and a Bachelor of Arts degree in social sciences, law, and economics from the University of Washington.

Career 
From 2001 to 2012, Harris-Talley was the program manager of Cardea Services, a Seattle-based non-profit. She previously served for 51 days as a member of the Seattle City Council in 2017, following the appointment of Tim Burgess as mayor. She was appointed on October 6, 2017, and was succeeded by Teresa Mosqueda following the certification of election results on November 28.

Personal life 
Harris-Talley identifies as queer. She and her husband, Jason, have two children.

References

Living people
African-American state legislators in Washington (state)
21st-century American politicians
People from Seattle
1979 births
People from Warrensburg, Missouri
School of the Art Institute of Chicago alumni
University of Washington alumni
Democratic Party members of the Washington House of Representatives
LGBT state legislators in Washington (state)
21st-century African-American politicians
20th-century African-American people